Figure skating at the 2011 Winter Universiade included a ladies' event for senior level skaters. The short program was held on February 3 and the free skating on February 4, 2011.

Results

References

External links
 Detailed results

Winter Universiade
Winter Universiade
Ladies singles